Henry Maurice Goguel (20 March 1880 – 31 March 1955) was Dean of the Protestant Faculty of Theology in Paris, director of studies at the École pratique des hautes études, and professor at the Sorbonne.

He published a substantial body of work of historical research on early Christianity. His Jesus the Nazarene: Myth or History? was an important rebuttal of the Christ myth theory.

He had three children, Elisabeth Labrousse, a philosopher, historian, and academic, Jean Goguel a geologist and geophysicist, and François Goguel.

Selected publications
The Religious Situation in France (1921)
Jesus the Nazarene: Myth or History? (translation by Frederick Stephens, 1926)
The Life of Jesus (translation by Olive Wyon, 1933)
The Birth of Christianity (translation by H. C. Snape, 1953)
Jesus and the Origins of Christianity (two volumes, 1960)
The Primitive Church (translation by H. C. Snape, 1963)

References

External links
 

1880 births
1955 deaths
20th-century French historians
Critics of the Christ myth theory
French male writers
French Protestants
Historians of Christianity
French historians of religion